Fancy Free is the fifth country studio album by the Oak Ridge Boys, released on March 26, 1981. It featured their biggest hit "Elvira". "Somewhere in the Night" was covered by Sawyer Brown in 1987 from their album of the same name. The title of the album was suggested by longtime Oak Ridge Boys personal assistant Charles Daunis, and he is thanked for this contribution in the liner notes.

The album is certified double platinum by the RIAA. It was also one of the first albums ever to achieve multi-platinum certification in the US, achieving the certification on October 12, 1984. It also became the band's first album to reach number one on the Billboard Top Country Albums chart.

Track listing

Personnel

The Oak Ridge Boys
Joe Bonsall, Duane Allen, Richard Sterban, William Lee Golden: All Vocals

The Band
Drums, Percussion: Kenneth A. Buttrey, Jerry Carrigan
Bass: John C. Williams
Acoustic & Electric Guitars: Barry Burton, James Capps, Chip Young, Billy Sanford, Reggie Young
Steel: Weldon Myrick
Keyboards: Ron Oates
Banjo: Bobby Thompson
Trumpet: Harrison Calloway, Jr.
Trombone: Charles Rose
Saxophone: Ronnie Eades, Harvey Thompson
Oboe: Bobby G. Taylor
Strings: John David Boyle, Marvin Chantry, Roy Christensen, Connie Ellison, Carl Gorodetzky, Lennie Haight, Sheldon Kurland, Dennis Molchan, Samuel Terranova, Gary VanOsdale, Stephanie Woolf
String Arrangements: D. Bergen White

Production
Produced By Ron Chancey
Engineers: Les Ladd
Assistant Engineers: Steve Ham, Bob Krusen, Russ Martin, Steve Melton
Mastering: Hank Williams

Charts

Weekly charts

Year-end charts

Singles

Notes 

The Oak Ridge Boys albums
1981 albums
MCA Records albums
Albums produced by Ron Chancey